= Na Jo Na Mohra =

- Town
- Location within Pakistan
- Coordinates: 33.25°N 73.16°E
- Country: Pakistan
- Province: (Islamabad Capital Territory) Islamabad C.T
- Elevation: 506 m (1,660 ft)
- Time zone: UTC+5 (PST)

Na Jo Na Mohra is a town in the Islamabad Capital Territory of Pakistan. It is located at 33° 24' 45N 73° 17' 20E with an altitude of 506 metres (1663 feet).
